Baker Township is a township in Osceola County, Iowa, in the United States.
The city of Melvin is located in Baker Township.  It has a population of 474.

History
Baker Township was founded in 1875.

References

Townships in Osceola County, Iowa
Townships in Iowa
1875 establishments in Iowa